Feng'en fuguo gong (Chinese: 奉恩辅国公, Manchu: ᡴᡝᠰᡳ ᠪᡝᡨᡠᠸᠠᡴᡳᠶᠠᡵᠠᡤᡠᡵᡠᠨ ᡩᡝᠠᡳᠰᡳᠯᠠᡵᠠᡤᡠᠩ, Möllendorf: kesi-be tuwakiyara gurun-be aisilara gung), translated as "Grace Bulwark Duke" or "Duke Who Assists to the State by the Grace" or "State Duke of the Second Rank", was one of the royal and noble titles of the Qing dynasty. A title was created in 1653 by division of the zhenguo gong title into two ranks following the criterium of sharing Eight Privilleges. The title was the eighth highest rank in the extended system of ranks and the fifth inheritable rank.

Rules of grant 
The title was the lowest possible to inherit in the peerage of the second rank except of special circumstances. The title could also convey a honorifical name consisting of two characters. The title could be made perpetually inheritable in case of abolition of the peerage.

The title could be granted to the son of Feng'en zhenguo gong born to State Duchess of the First Rank.

Family members

Princess consort 
Princess consort was styled as "feng'en fuguo gong furen" (奉恩辅国公夫人), which translates to "State Duchess of the Second Rank". Often the title was replaced by the term Primary Wife (嫡妻).

Sons 
Son of feng'en fuguo gong was granted a title of third class bulwark general. As the title was the last possible for the peerage, the right to inherit the title of Duke of the Second Rank was reserved to the sons born to primary consorts. However, the title son inherited could convey different honorifical name in case when father's title had been given honorifical name. De facto sons born to secondary consorts of the feng'en fuguo duke received various official positions and became unranked imperial clansmen.

Daughters 
Daughter born to primary consort of feng'en zhenguo duke was granted a title of Lady of the Third Rank (乡君). Daughters born to secondary consort of feng'en fuguo gong were granted a title of sixth rank clanswoman.

Allowances and court attire

Feng'en zhenguo gong

Allowance 
The allowance of grace bulwark duke reached 500 taels of silver and 500 hu of rice.

Attire 

 Mandarin hat with ruby-inlaid finial decorated with two dragons and 4 pearls (winter) or 1 turquoise and 1 pearl (summer) and two-eyed peacock feathers
 Court dress befitting prince of the third rank
 Surcoat befitting grace defender duke
 Fur coat befitting grace defender duke

State duchess of the second rank

Attire 

 Crown decorated with 3 peacocks each embellished with three pearls, finial with 4 pearls and ruby and 3 strings of pearls connected with two lapis lazuli inlaid plaques
 Diadem decorated with 4 ruyi cloud shaped plaques bejeweled with pearls and 3 strings of pearls connected with two lapis lazuli inlaid plaques
 Formal and semiformal robes befitting princess consort of the third rank
 Surcoat befitting state duchess of the first rank

Xiangjun

Allowance 
The basic allotment of xiangjun reached 40 taels and 40 hu of rice. As most of the ladies of the third rank were married off, the allowance included 40 taels and 5 rolls of fabrics. Xiangjun was allowed to have 4  personal maids and 2 bodyguards.

Attire 

 Crown and diadem befitting state duchess of the second rank
 Court robes befitting princess consort of the third rank
 Semiformal robes befitting state duchess of the first rank

Notable titles 
The following table includes the titles conveying honorifical names. The table is constructed chronologically.

References 

 
Chinese royal titles